Cerithiopsis scalaris is a species of sea snail, a gastropod in the family Cerithiopsidae, which is known from European waters, including the Mediterranean Sea. It was described by Locard, in 1892.

References

scalaris
Gastropods described in 1892